The Kahnawake Hunters are a Junior "B" box lacrosse team from Kahnawake, Quebec, Canada.  The Hunters play in the Ontario Junior B Lacrosse League and are eligible for the Founders Cup National Championship.  The Hunters are the only Quebec team in the OJBLL.

History
The Hunters were proposed by Kahnawake Minor Lacrosse in 2007 as local players had nowhere to play after graduating the minor levels. In 2008, the team operated as an intermediate squad before applying as a Junior B team for the 2009 season.

The Kahnawake Hunters made their debut in 2009 in the Ontario Junior B Lacrosse League.  The Hunters expansion marked the first time a Kahnawake team competed in Junior B in almost a decade. In their first season, the Hunters finished with a record of 3 wins, 15 losses, and 2 ties.

Season-by-season results
Note: GP = Games played, W = Wins, L = Losses, T = Ties, Pts = Points, GF = Goals for, GA = Goals against

Alumni 

 Stone Jacobs (2016-17) - University of Vermont '23
 Koleton Marquis (2018-22) - committed to Johns Hopkins University
 Teioshontathe McComber (2014-19) - Victoria Shamrocks (BCJALL); University of Albany '22
 Brine Rice (2014-16) - 51st pick of the 2016 NLL Draft

References

External links
Kahnawake Hunters website
OJBLL website

Ontario Lacrosse Association teams
Lacrosse of the Iroquois Confederacy
2009 establishments in Quebec
Lacrosse clubs established in 2009